María del Mar Regueras Serrano better known as Mar Regueras (born 11 April 1970) is a Spanish film, television and theatre actress.
She was nominated for Goya Award for Best Supporting Actress for her acting in Rencor (2002).

Career 
Mar took her initial training from Theatre Institute of Barcelona where Francisco Pino was the trainer. She was also trained from Superior Dancr Institute of Barcelona (classical, contemporary, jazz).

Filmography

films 
 2007: Los Totenwackers
 2006: GAL
 2005: 
 Ninette
 Volando voy
 2003: 
Sin hogar
 La flaqueza del bolchevique
 2002: Rencor
 2001: Mi casa es tu casa

Television

Television programs 

 1997-1998: Música sí (on La 1) as Presenter
 1996-1997: Grand Prix (on La 1) as Co-presenter
 1993-1994: El Gran Juego de la Oca (on Antena 3)
2017: Cámbiame as Invited Guest

Theatre 
 2010-2012: La guerra de los Rose
 2000: Top Dogs
 1999: Chicago
 1993-1994: Golfus de Roma
 1992: Cabaret

References

External links 
 Mar Regueras webpage (archived copy)
 

Living people
1970 births
Actresses from Barcelona
Spanish film actresses
Spanish television actresses
21st-century Spanish actresses